Inter Miami CF is an American professional soccer team based in Miami, Florida, that competes in Major League Soccer (MLS).

This is a list of club records for Miami, which dates from their inaugural season in 2020 to present.

Player records
Current players on the Miami roster are shown in bold.

Most appearances

Top goalscorers

Most clean sheets

Coaching records

List of seasons

Transfers
As per MLS rules and regulations; some transfer fees have been undisclosed and are not included in the tables below.

Highest transfer fees paid

References

Inter Miami CF
Miami-related lists
American soccer clubs records and statistics
Inter Miami CF records and statistics